Millionyoung (sometimes stylized as MillionYoung) is the pseudonym of Floridian indie/electronica producer Mike Diaz. Described as chillwave, Millionyoung's sound includes electronic and sampled elements coupled with vocals from Diaz.

Discography

Studio albums

Extended plays

References

Musicians from Florida
Chillwave musicians
American electronic musicians